Vince Gilligan is an American director, producer, and screenwriter who has received various awards and nominations, including one British Academy Television Award, one Directors Guild of America Award, one Golden Globe Award, four Primetime Emmy Awards, two Producers Guild of America Awards, and six Writers Guild of America Awards.

Gilligan received his first three Primetime Emmy Award nominations for his work as a producer and screenwriter on the fourth and fifth seasons of the science fiction drama television series The X-Files (1993–2002). He rose to prominence with AMC's crime drama television series Breaking Bad (2008–2013), which he created, directed, produced and wrote. The series' five seasons received universal acclaim, with critics lauding it as one of the greatest television series of all time. Breaking Bad earned Gilligan a total of nine Primetime Emmy Award nominations, winning two consecutive awards for Outstanding Drama Series for the show's two-part final season. The series also earned him a BAFTA TV Award for Best International Programme, a Golden Globe Award for Best Television Series – Drama, two Producers Guild of America Awards for Best Episodic Drama, a Directors Guild of America Award for Outstanding Directing in a Drama Series for the final episode "Felina", and five Writers Guild of America Awards in the categories Best Dramatic Series and Best Episodic Drama.

In 2015, Gilligan developed a Breaking Bad spin-off centered around the character of Saul Goodman (Bob Odenkirk), titled Better Call Saul (2015–2022). It earned him nine Primetime Emmy Award nominations, winning two awards for Outstanding Short Form Comedy or Drama Series for the two short form web series Employee Training with Gus Fring (2017) and Ethics Training with Kim Wexler (2020).

In 2019, he wrote and directed the film El Camino: A Breaking Bad Movie, that serves as a sequel and epilogue to Breaking Bad, continuing the story of Jesse Pinkman (Aaron Paul). The film was nominated for the Primetime Emmy Award for Outstanding Television Movie, while Gilligan received his third Directors Guild of America Award nomination.

Awards and nominations

Notes

See also 
 List of accolades received by El Camino: A Breaking Bad Movie
 List of accolades received by The X-Files
 List of awards and nominations received by Better Call Saul
 List of awards and nominations received by Breaking Bad

References

External links 
 List of awards and nominations at IMDb

Gilligan, Vince
Gilligan, Vince